Shine is the fourth studio album by the symphonic metal band Edenbridge. Produced by Dennis Ward, it features 12 tracks that have been compared to the style of Edguy, Stratovarius and Masterplan.

Reception

The German edition of Metal Hammer awarded 5 out of 7 points but noted that singer Sabine Edelsbacher could not convey as much pathos as Amy Lee, Sharon den Adel or Tarja Turunen. She was instead found reminiscent of Candice Night when singing slower, medievally inspired tracks. The reviewer for Rock Hard wrote that Edenbridge had found a balance between romanticism and kitsch, but requested more uptempo tracks.

Track listing

Credits

Musicians
Sabine Edelsbacher – vocals
Lanvall – guitar, bass, keyboards
Roland Navratil – drums
Andreas Eibler – guitar

Guest musicians
Dennis Ward – backing vocals
Astrid Stockhammer – violin

Productions
Mixed by Dennis Ward
Mastered by Jürgen Lusky
Cover Design by Thomas Ewerhard, idea by Mike Koren

References

2004 albums
Edenbridge (band) albums
Massacre Records albums